Slatington Historic District is a national historic district located at Slatington, Lehigh County, Pennsylvania.  The district includes 506 contributing buildings and 2 contributing sites in the central business district and surrounding residential areas of Slatington.

It was added to the National Register of Historic Places in 2004.

Gallery

References

External links

Historic districts on the National Register of Historic Places in Pennsylvania
Historic districts in Lehigh County, Pennsylvania
National Register of Historic Places in Lehigh County, Pennsylvania